The 1934–35 season was Madrid Football Club's 33rd season in existence, and their 7th consecutive season in the Primera División. The club also played in the Campeonato Regional Mancomunado (Joint Regional Championship) and the Copa del Presidente de la República (President of the Republic's Cup).

Summary
The club appointed Francisco Bru as coach for the season after a good streak of results last season. The squad was reinforced with several players, including forward Fernando Sañudo, Diz, Losada, Lopez, Rodrigo, Alonso and the first foreign transfer ever for the club, Hungarian goalkeeper Gyula Alberti. Despite a Clásico record for the biggest win in the league, a massive score of 8–2 on 3 February 1935 vs FC Barcelona, including a poker of goals from "Golden Feet" Sañudo, the team ended up runners-up for the second consecutive year, this time losing the title by a single point to champions Betis Balompié.

Meanwhile, in the 1935 Copa del Presidente de la República, the team was defeated by Sevilla Football Club in the round of 16.

Squad

Transfers

Competitions

La Liga

League table

Results by round

Matches

Campeonato Regional Mancomunado Centro-Sur

League table

Copa del Presidente de la República

Round of 16

Statistics

Player statistics

Notes

References

Real Madrid CF seasons
Spanish football clubs 1934–35 season